National road 54 is a route belonging to the Polish national road network. This route connects the Expressway S22 at the Braniewo-Południe junction near Chruściel with the Gronowo-Mamonovo border crossing near Russia.

Major towns and villages along the route 
 Glinka
 Prątnik
 Braniewo
 Młoteczno
 Gronowo

Axle load limit 
National road 54 has an axle limit restrictions.

The allowed axle limit is up to 11.5 tons, which is a standard limit on Polish national roads.

References 

54